Bay Area Ambassadors was an American soccer team based in Hayward, California, United States. Active from 2009 to 2012, the team played in National Premier Soccer League (NPSL), a national amateur league at the fourth tier of the American Soccer Pyramid, in the Northwest Division.

The team played its home games at Gladiator Stadium on the campus of Chabot College, and the team's colors were white, black and red.

History
In 2013 the team moved to Oakland, California, joined the NorCal Division of U.S. Club Soccer's National Premier Leagues, and changed their name to Oakland Ambassadors FC.

Players

2011 roster
Source:

Year-by-year

Head coaches
  Paul McCallion (2009)
  Ajit Rana (2010–present)
Joao Bule - intern (2010-2011)
  Roland Tillak (2010–present)
 Mohammed Mohammed (2010–present)

Stadia
 Gladiator Stadium at Chabot College; Hayward, California (2009–2012)

References

Association football clubs established in 2009
National Premier Soccer League teams
Soccer clubs in the San Francisco Bay Area
Sports in Hayward, California
2009 establishments in California